Alison Mackinnon  (born 1942  Shepparton Victoria) as Alison Gay Madin (Maiden) is a social historian who has contributed to both Australian and women's history. Particular areas of expertise are the history of education, women's social and demographic history, the history and politics of population change, population ageing, and work and responsibility changes wrought by globalisation.

Mackinnon graduated from the University of Melbourne with a BA and DipEd before moving to the University of Adelaide where she completed a MA and PhD.

Mackinnon was elected a Fellow of the Academy of the Social Science in Australia in 2005. In the 2009 Australia Day Honours she was appointed a Member of the Order of Australia for "service to education, particularly in the fields of social research and development, as an academic and author, and to the community through roles with history organisations".

Selected publications
 Women, Love and Learning: The Double Bind (2010)
 Hope: The Everyday and Imaginary Life of Young People on the Margins, with Simon Robb, Patrick O'Leary and Peter Bishop (2010)
 Love and Freedom (1997) (awarded a New South Wales Premier's Literary Award)
 The New Women: Adelaide's Early Women Graduates (1986)

Books edited
 The Hawke Legacy: Towards a Sustainable Society, with Gerry Bloustien and Barbara Comber (2009)
 Fresh Water: New Perspectives on Water in Australia, with Stephen McKenzie and Jennifer McKay (2007)
 Gender and the Restructured University, with Ann Brooks (2001)
 Gender and Institutions: Welfare, Work and Citizenship, Moira Gatens (1998)
 Education into the 21st Century, with Alison MacKinnon, Inga Elgqvist-Saltzman and Alison Prentice (1998)

References 

1942 births
Living people
Australian women historians
Members of the Order of Australia
Fellows of the Academy of the Social Sciences in Australia
University of Melbourne alumni
University of Adelaide alumni